Page Plus Cellular is a prepaid mobile virtual network operator in the United States operated by TracFone Wireless, Inc. using Verizon’s wireless network, subsidiary of Verizon Communications.

History 
Page Plus Cellular was established in 1993 by Abdul Yassine, as Page Plus Communications, selling pager services in the Toledo, Ohio, area. In August 1998 the company was renamed Page Plus Cellular and launched services in Ohio and Michigan, followed by a nationwide launch in 2000.

Page Plus was originally headquartered in Holland, Ohio, and owned by Abdul Yassine. and as of January 2014, the Better Business Bureau had given it a rating of A+ with 151 complaints closed in the previous 3 years.

In May 2013, Mexican telecommunications company América Móvil purchased Page Plus Cellular for an undisclosed amount. As of January 6, 2014, regulatory approval was received and Page Plus Cellular has joined other Américan Móvil subsidiaries like TracFone. At the time of sale, Page Plus Cellular had 1.4 million subscribers.  Page Plus Cellular, under the new ownership, is also a Better Business Bureau Accredited business with an A+ rating, since July 7, 2014, with 87 complaints filed with the [Better Business Bureau] in the past 3 years, with 50 of those being the past year, as of February 10, 2015.

Services
Page Plus Cellular offers both pay-as-you-go and no-contract monthly plans. Both monthly and pay-as-you-go customers add voice minutes, data and text messages to their account by purchasing refill cards.

Authorized dealers
Page Plus Cellular sources its services to dealers who work as independent contractors under its own company name. Such sellers are known as authorized dealers with physical and/or online stores.  Dealers can be located on their website.

References

External links
 

Companies established in 1993
Mobile virtual network operators
América Móvil